Golkowice may refer to the following places in Poland:
Golkowice, Lower Silesian Voivodeship (south-west Poland)
Golkowice, Lesser Poland Voivodeship (south Poland)

See also 
 Gołkowice